Shangri-La Hotels and Resorts is a multinational hospitality company. Founded in 1971 by tycoon Robert Kuok in Malaysia, the company now has over 100 luxury hotels and resorts with over 40,000 rooms in Africa, Asia, Europe, the Middle East, North America and Australia. 

Shangri-La has 4 brands across different market segments: Shangri-La, Traders Hotels, Kerry Hotels and Hotel Jen. The current chairman is Kuok Hui-kwong.

History
The first hotel of the luxury Shangri-La Hotels and Resorts Group was the Shangri-La Hotel Singapore, opened on 23 April 1971. The name derives from the mythical place Shangri-La, described in the 1933 novel Lost Horizon by British author James Hilton. 

The Shangri-La Hotel Singapore was managed by Westin Hotels & Resorts, until Shangri-La International Hotel Management Limited was founded in 1979, and management of the Singapore Shangri-La was taken back over from Westin in 1984. However, it would not be until 1991 that Shangri-La assumed control of the rest of the hotels.

This hotel has also become a prominent inter-governmental security conference known as the Shangri-La Dialogue.

Senior Leadership 
 Chairman and Executive Director: Kuok Hui-kwong (since January 2017)
 Executive Director and Group CEO: Lim Beng Chee (since January 2017)

Former chairmen 

 Robert Kuok (1984–1993)
 Pho Ba Quan (1993–1994)
 Richard Liu (1994–1997)
 Beau Kuok Khoon-chen (1997–2000)
 Alex Ye (2000–2003)
 Edward Kuok Khoon-loong (2003–2008)
 Kuok Khoon-ean (2008–2013)
 Beau Kuok Khoon-chen (2013–2017); second term

Former chief executives 

 Robert Kuok (1984–1993)
 Pho Ba Quan (1993–1994)
 Paul Bush (1994–1997)
 Chye Kuok Khoon-ho (1997–2002)
 Edward Kuok Khoon-loong (2008–2009)
 Kuok Khoon-ean (2009–2013)
 Beau Kuok Khoon-chen (2013–2017)

Companies
Shangri-La Asia Limited is incorporated in Bermuda with limited liability. It is primarily listed on the Stock Exchange of Hong Kong Limited (stock code 00069) with a secondary listing on the Singapore Exchange Securities Trading Limited (stock code Shang Asia 2kHK$) and with American Depositary Receipt traded as SHALY. Since 1997, Shangri-La Asia Limited has owned Shangri-La International Hotel Management Limited.
Shangri-La Hotels (Malaysia) Berhad is incorporated in Malaysia with limited liability and is traded on the Bursa Malaysia Securities Berhad (stock code 5517).
Shangri-La Hotel Public Company Limited is incorporated in Thailand with limited liability and is traded on the Stock Exchange of Thailand (stock code SHANG).

Hotels 
As of March 2022, Shangri-La owns, operates, or manages 100 hotels in 77 destinations.

Breakdown by brand

Breakdown by geography

Africa 
 Mauritius: 2

Asia 
 Mainland China: 55
 Malaysia: 8
 Philippines: 5
 Singapore: 5
 Hong Kong: 4
 Indonesia: 3
 India: 2
 Myanmar: 2
 Sri-Lanka: 2
 Taiwan: 2
 Thailand: 2
 Cambodia: 1
 Japan: 1
 Maldives: 1
 Mongolia: 1

Middle East 
 United Arab Emirates: 3
 Oman: 2
 Bahrain: 1
 Saudi Arabia: 1

Europe 
 France: 1
 United Kingdom: 1
 Turkey: 1

Americas 
 Canada: 2

Oceania 
 Australia: 3
 Fiji: 1

See also 

 Kerry Properties
 Robert Kuok

References

External links

 
 Investor Relations
 Kerry Hotels
 Traders Hotels
 Traders Hotel Beijing

 
1993 initial public offerings
Companies listed on the Hong Kong Stock Exchange
Companies listed on the Frankfurt Stock Exchange
Companies listed on the Singapore Exchange
Companies listed on the Stock Exchange of Thailand
Former companies in the Hang Seng Index
Hotels established in 1971
Hong Kong brands
Singaporean brands
Hospitality companies of Hong Kong
Hospitality companies
Multinational companies headquartered in Hong Kong
Singaporean companies established in 1971